Thyrosticta agatha is a moth of the subfamily Arctiinae first described by Oberthür in 1893. It is native to Madagascar.

It has a wingspan of 28 mm.

References

Arctiinae